The Port of Tripoli is the principal sea port in Tripoli, the capital of Libya, and one of the oldest ports in the Mediterranean.
The port serves general cargo, bulk cargo & passengers.

History

Since Roman Libya the port of Tripoli (then called Oea) was one of the main in coastal Mediterranean Africa. In the Middle Ages the port fell in disuse, but under Ottoman rule started to grow in importance. In the late 1920s the Italian colonial authorities created the port that exists today. Other important infrastructures added in the 1930s were the enlargement of the port of Tripoli with the addition of a seaplane facility. The port was severely damaged during WWII.

Features
In the 1970s the port was greatly improved: now the port of Tripoli contains many cargo terminals, and is capable of servicing many ships at once. The port also features a yacht club, and a fishing wharf.

The "Socialist Ports Company" is the port authority responsible for managing and operating the Port of Tripoli, which handled general and bulk cargoes and passengers.

Protected by two breakwaters of 2000 and 700 meters, the harbor covers about 300 hectares. About 600 huge vessels visited the Port of Tripoli each year until the end of Gaddafi regime. The port can accommodate vessels to 190 meters long with maximum draft of 10.7 meters.

See also
 Tripoli
 Port of Benghazi
 Tripolitania

References

External links

Tripoli Port site (in arab)

Neighborhoods of Tripoli, Libya
Tripoli